Kishindih or Kishindeh is the southernmost district in Balkh province. Its capital is Kishindinh Bala, situated in the northern part of the district.

References

Districts of Balkh Province